A hybrid solar eclipse occurred on October 3, 1986. A hybrid eclipse starts and ends as an annular, but is total in the middle around the point of greatest eclipse. Totality occurred for a very short time (calculated at 0.08 seconds) in an area in the Atlantic Ocean, just east of the southern tip of Greenland. The path, on the surface of the Earth, was a narrow, tapered, horse-shoe, and visible only from a thin strip between Iceland and Greenland.  At maximum eclipse the solar elevation was about 6°. The path width was just about 800 meters wide.

This eclipse was the last central eclipse of saros 124 and the only hybrid eclipse of that saros.

The eclipse resulted in litigation involving a Florida fourth grader whose eyes were allegedly damaged when he viewed the eclipse on school grounds.  A lower court had dismissed the case on the grounds that the school had no duty to supervise the child after school hours.  But the Florida Court of Appeals ruled in 1994 that the jury instruction on that question was improper, and remanded the case.

Solar Saros 124 
This is the eclipse number 53 of Solar Saros 124.

Saros cycle 124, repeating every 18 years, 11 days, containing 73 events. The series started with partial solar eclipse on March 6, 1049. It contains total eclipses from June 12, 1211 through September 22, 1968 with one hybrid solar eclipse on October 3, 1986. The series ends at member 73 as a partial eclipse on May 11, 2347. The longest duration of totality was 5 minutes, 46 seconds on May 3, 1734.

Eclipse date: 3 October 1986

Saros length: 1298 years

Saros duration past: 937 years

Related eclipses

Eclipses of 1986 
 A partial solar eclipse on April 9.
 A total lunar eclipse on April 24.
 A hybrid solar eclipse on October 3.
 A total lunar eclipse on October 17.

Solar eclipses of 1986–1989

Saros 124

Metonic cycle

References

External links 
 03 October 1986: A Geometrically Remarkable Eclipse

1986 in science
1986 10 3
October 1986 events
1986 10 3